Bishak Tappeh (also Romanized as Bīshak Tappeh; also known as Beshīk Tapeh and Pashk Tappeh) is a village in Golidagh Rural District, Golidagh District, Maraveh Tappeh County, Golestan Province, Iran. At the 2006 census, its population was 250, in 38 families.

References 

Populated places in Maraveh Tappeh County